Wadaginam is a divergent Madang language of the Adelbert Range of Papua New Guinea.

References

Tomul languages
Languages of Madang Province